Young Brown, or Abe Brown (born September 24, 1893, date of death unknown), was a welterweight boxer from New York City.

Biography
Brown was born on September 24, 1893. On September 18, 1912, he boxed Young Jack O'Brien at the St. Nicholas Arena in New York City.

References

Boxers from New York (state)
Welterweight boxers
1893 births
Year of death missing
American male boxers